Reinhold Timm (died 12 January 1639) was a Danish painter. From 1619 he participated in the decoration in the Long Hall at Rosenborg Castle in Copenhagen with 7 or 8 large allegorical paintings of which only one, Unge mænd brydes på en bro, is signed while the others are attributed. Today they are kept at Kronborg Castle.

From 1624 he was a drawing teacher at Sorø Academy.

See also
 Art of Denmark

References

External links 

17th-century Danish painters
Danish male painters
Renaissance painters
1639 deaths
Year of birth unknown